The Burning Season is a 1994 American made-for-television biographical drama film directed by John Frankenheimer. The film chronicles environmental activist Chico Mendes' fight to protect the Amazon rainforest. This was Raul Julia's last film released during his lifetime, premiering on HBO on September 16, 1994, five weeks before his death. The film was based in part on the 1990 book of the same name by journalist Andrew Revkin.

Plot
Chico Mendes was a Brazilian rubber tapper, unionist and environmental activist who was murdered in 1988 by ranchers opposed to his activism. The movie opens in 1951 with a young Mendes witnessing his father's interaction with corrupt ranchers who are exploiting peasants for their work. The bulk of the film then takes place between 1983 and 1988, showing Mendes' activism to preserve the Amazon rainforest, to his murder in a drive-by shooting by a disgruntled rancher waiting in the shadows.

Cast
 Raul Julia as Francisco "Chico" Mendes
 Carmen Argenziano as Alfredo Sezero
 Sônia Braga as Regina de Carvalho
 Kamala Lopez as Ilzamar
 Luis Guzmán as Estate Boss
 Nigel Havers as Steven Kaye
 Tomas Milian as Darli Alves
 Esai Morales as Jair
 Edward James Olmos as Wilson Pinheiro
 Roger Cudney as Reporter

Awards and nominations
American Cinema Editors
Nominated: Best Edited Motion Picture for Non-Commercial Television (Françoise Bonnot and Paul Rubell)
 
Casting Society of America
Nominated: Best Casting for TV Movie of the Week (Junie Lowry-Johnson)

Emmy Awards 
Won: Outstanding Directing in Miniseries or a Special (John Frankenheimer)
Won: Outstanding Lead Actor in a Miniseries or a Special  (Raul Julia [posthumously])
Nominated: Outstanding Writing for a Miniseries or a Special (Ron Hutchinson, William Mastrosimone and Michael Tolkin)
Nominated: Outstanding Made for Television Movie
Nominated: Outstanding Supporting Actor in a Miniseries or a Special (Edward James Olmos)
Nominated: Outstanding Supporting Actress in a Miniseries or a Special (Sônia Braga)

Golden Globe Awards
Won: Best Actor in a Mini-Series or Motion Picture Made for TV (Raul Julia [posthumously])
Won: Best Mini-Series or Motion Picture Made for TV
Won: Best Actor in a Supporting Role in a Series, Mini-Series or Motion Picture Made for TV (Edward James Olmos)
Nominated: Best Actress in a Supporting Role in a Series, Mini-Series or Motion Picture Made for TV (Sônia Braga)

Screen Actors Guild Awards
Won: Outstanding Performance by a Male Actor in a TV Movie or Miniseries (Raul Julia [posthumously])

External links

 

The Burning Season: The Murder of Chico Mendes and the Fight for the Amazon Rain Forest (1990 Mendes biography by Andrew Revkin)

1994 films
1994 drama films
1994 in the environment
1994 television films
1990s biographical drama films
American biographical drama films
American films based on actual events
Best Miniseries or Television Movie Golden Globe winners
Environmental films
Films about trees
Films based on biographies
Films directed by John Frankenheimer
Films scored by Gary Chang
Films set in Brazil
Films set in forests
Films shot in Mexico
Films with screenplays by Michael Tolkin
HBO Films films
1990s American films